Michigan Valley is an unincorporated community in Osage County, Kansas, United States.  It is located a couple miles east of Pomona Lake.

History
A post office was opened in Michigan Valley in 1870, and remained in operation until it was discontinued in 1967.

References

Further reading

External links
 Osage County maps: Current, Historic, KDOT

Unincorporated communities in Osage County, Kansas
Unincorporated communities in Kansas